The Istana Jahar was a royal residence in Kota Bharu, Kelantan, Malaysia. 

It was built in 1855 by Sultan Muhammad II of Kelantan for his grandson Long Kundur. The palace has a pentagon-shaped porte-cochère with the first floor balcony from which members of the royal family could watch ceremonies held in front of the palace. 

Today, the palace houses the Museum of Royal Traditions and Customs of Kelantan.

Further reading

External links 

Bangunan Muzium Adat Istiadat Diraja (in Malay)
Image of the Istana Jahar

Buildings and structures in Kelantan
Kota Bharu
Royal residences in Malaysia